Arthur Chichester  (30 November 1783 – 16 July 1869) was an English politician.

He was a Member (MP) of the Parliament of the United Kingdom for Honiton 8 January 1835.

References

1777 births
1869 deaths
UK MPs 1835–1837
Members of the Parliament of the United Kingdom for Honiton